Nuwekloof Pass, is situated in the Eastern Cape, a province of South Africa, on the regional road R332, at the Baviaanskloof.

Mountain passes of the Eastern Cape